"Tellement j'ai d'amour pour toi" (meaning "I Have So Much Love for You") is the first single from Celine Dion's album Tellement j'ai d'amour.... It was released on 13 December 1982 in Quebec, Canada.

Background
On 31 October 1982, with this track Dion won a gold medal for Outstanding Song Award at the World Popular Song Festival in Tokyo, Japan and the Yamaha Symphony Orchestra Award for Best Artist. Dion performed "Tellement j'ai d'amour pour toi" in front of 115 million of TV viewers and 12,000 in the audience. There were 1907 contestants and 30 finalists.

Dion received also 4 Félix Awards the following year and one of them in category: Quebec Artist Achieving the Most Success Outside the Province of Quebec. The single was a hit in Quebec. It entered the chart on 25 December 1982, peaking at number 3. "Tellement j'ai d'amour pour toi" re-entered the chart on 22 October 1983 and stayed there through 14 January 1984, peaking this time at number 17. It spent forty four weeks on the chart.

The B-side of that release was another album track called "Écoutez-moi".

"Tellement j'ai d'amour pour toi" appeared on Dion's 2005 French best of album On ne change pas.

Track listings and formats
Canadian 7" single
"Tellement j'ai d'amour pour toi" – 2:56
"Écoutez-moi" – 3:03

Charts

References

1982 singles
1982 songs
Celine Dion songs
French-language songs
Song recordings produced by Eddy Marnay
Songs written by Eddy Marnay
Songs written by Hubert Giraud